Lingyanshan Temple is a prominent Buddhist temple with a 1600-year history in Suzhou, was the palace for Xishi in BC494 located at the peak of Lingyan Hill.

References

Buddhist temples in Suzhou